Campbell Leonard Macpherson (July 4, 1907 – June 28, 1973) was a businessman born in St. John's, Colony of Newfoundland and was the third lieutenant governor of Newfoundland.

The son of Cluny and Eleanora Macpherson, he was educated at Methodist College, St. John's, Westminster School, London and Columbia University was appointed Lieutenant Governor of Newfoundland and Labrador in 1957. He began his career in the family business at The Royal Stores in 1925. In 1965 he became president of that establishment upon the death of his uncle, Harold Macpherson.

Macpherson was an original member of Memorial University's board of regents from 1949 to 1957. He was also a member of the board of governors of Prince of Wales College.

External links
Biography at Government House The Governorship of Newfoundland and Labrador

1907 births
1973 deaths
Businesspeople from St. John's, Newfoundland and Labrador
Lieutenant Governors of Newfoundland and Labrador
People educated at Westminster School, London